The  is one of the tallest buildings in Naha City, Okinawa, Japan, and is the center for Japanese governmental functions stretching across Okinawa Prefecture. There are 14 floors above ground and two below including a civic hall and government information center. The top floor houses a cafeteria where a panoramic view of Naha City can be seen. The building opened in 1990 and cost nearly 22 billion yen (about 200 million USD). It was designed by architect Kisho Kurokawa.

Government buildings in Japan
Buildings and structures in Okinawa Prefecture
Naha
Government buildings completed in 1990
1990 establishments in Japan